Brendan Carr may refer to:

 Brendan Carr (politician), Irish politician
 Brendan Carr (lawyer), American lawyer
 Brendan Carr (physician), American medical doctor and professor